Latvia competed at the 2015 European Games, in Baku, Azerbaijan from 12 to 28 June 2015.

Medalists

Archery

Badminton

Latvia has qualified 1 athlete.

 Women's singles – 1 quota place

Canoe sprint

Latvia has qualified 1 athlete.

 Men's K1 200 m – 1 quota place

Gymnastics

Artistic
Women's – 3 quota places

Rhythmic
Latvia has qualified one athlete after the performance at the 2013 Rhythmic Gymnastics European Championships.
 Individual – 1 quota place

Triathlon

Men – Andrejs Dmitrijevs

References

Nations at the 2015 European Games
European Games
2015